Pope Benedict VIII (– 9 April 1024) was bishop of Rome and ruler of the Papal States from 18 May 1012 until his death. He was born Theophylact to the noble family of the counts of Tusculum. Unusually for a medieval pope, he had strong authority both in Rome and abroad.

Early life
Theophylact was born to Count Gregory I of Tusculum. The family had already produced three popes: John XI (r. 931–935), and John XII (r. 955–964), and Benedict VII (r. 973–974). Theophylact became pope on 18 May 1012 and took the name Benedict VIII.

Pontificate
Benedict VIII was opposed by an antipope, Gregory VI, who compelled him to flee Rome. He was restored by King Henry II of Germany, whom he crowned emperor on 14 February 1014. He remained on good terms with Henry for his entire pontificate. In Benedict VIII's pontificate, the Saracens renewed their attacks on the southern coasts of Italy. They affected a settlement in Sardinia and sacked Pisa. The Normans also then began to settle in Italy. The Pope promoted peace in Italy by allying himself with the Normans, orchestrating the defeat of the Saracens in Sardinia and subjugating the Crescentii. In 1022, he held a synod at Pavia with the Emperor to restrain simony and incontinence of the clergy. The reformation sponsored by Cluny Abbey was supported by him, and he was a friend of its abbot, St. Odilo.

In 1020, Benedict VIII travelled to Germany to confer with Henry II about the renewed Byzantine menace in the Mezzogiorno. Arriving at Bamberg at Eastertide, he consecrated the new cathedral there, obtained a charter from Henry II confirming the donations of Charlemagne and Otto the Great, and visited the monastery of Fulda. In 1022, Benedict received Archbishop Æthelnoth of Canterbury, who had traveled to Rome to obtain the pallium.

To further the interest of peace, Benedict VIII encouraged the Truce of God. He convinced the Holy Roman emperor to lead an expedition into the south of Italy and subordinate his vassals who had defected to Byzantine authority. Horace Mann considered him "...one of the few popes of the Middle Ages who was at once powerful at home and great abroad." He was succeeded by his brother, John XIX.

Family tree
Benedict VIII was closely related to five other popes who reigned in the 10th and 11th centuries, as well as some of the most powerful rulers of Italy at the time.

See also

List of popes

References

980s births
1024 deaths
Popes
Italian popes
11th-century archbishops
Year of birth unknown
11th-century popes
Counts of Tusculum
Burials at St. Peter's Basilica